This is a list of airports in Argentina, sorted by location.



Airports 
ICAO location identifiers link to airport page at Organismo Regulador del Sistema Nacional de Aeropuertos (ORSNA), where available. Map of airports.

Airport names shown in bold indicate the airport has scheduled service on commercial airlines.

See also 
 Transportation in Argentina
 Argentine Air Force
 List of airports in Argentina by ICAO code
 List of airline destinations in Argentina

References

  AIP Argentina
  Organismo Regulador del Sistema Nacional de Aeropuertos (ORSNA)
 Aeropuertos Argentina 2000
 Airports in Argentina from enjoy-Argentina.org
 Great Circle Mapper Airports in Argentina, reference for airport codes
 World Aero Data: Airports in Argentina, reference for coordinates
 
  - includes IATA codes
 

Argentina
 
Airports
Airports
Argentina